The Croatian euro coins are a set of euro coins currently being minted by the Croatian Mint since July 2022. They are the official euro coins with the national motif of Croatia. 

The euro was introduced as a replacement for the Croatian kuna on 1 January 2023. The kuna and the euro were in dual circulation until 14 January 2023 in order to aid the gradual transition to the euro. Prices are displayed in both currencies since 5 September 2022, and will continue to be until 31 December 2023. The euro coins were made available for purchase on 1 December 2022. Each package cost 100 kunas (13.28 euros).

Remaining kuna coins can be exchanged in all banks, Croatian Post offices and the Croatian Financial Agency (Fina) until 31st December 2023. After that period only the Croatian National Bank (HNB) will handle the exchanges. Kuna banknotes can be exchanged indefinitely, while kuna coins can be exchanged until 31 December 2025.

History 
On 21 July 2021, Prime Minister of Croatia Andrej Plenković stated that national identifying marks on the Croatian euro coins would be the Croatian checkerboard, the map of Croatia, a marten, Nikola Tesla and the Glagolitic script.

On 4 February 2022, the Government of Croatia presented the designs for the national side of the future Croatian euro coins, which were chosen in an open contest by the Council of the Croatian National Bank. For the 2€ coin, a design with the geographical map of Croatia by designer Ivan Šivak was chosen. The edge inscription uses lyrics from Ivan Gundulić's 1628 pastoral play Dubravka. For the 1€ coin, a design with a marten ( in Croatian) standing on a branch, an animal after which the Croatian currency at the time was named, by designer Stjepan Pranjković was chosen. For the 10c, 20c and 50c coins, a design with Nikola Tesla, who was born in Smiljan (present-day Croatia, then-Austrian Empire), by designer Ivan Domagoj Račić was chosen. Finally, for 1c, 2c and 5c coins, a design with ligature bound letters Ⱈ (H) and Ⱃ (R) in Glagolitic script by designer Maja Škripelj was chosen. Each author received 70,000 kn (approx. 9,300€) for their chosen design.

After suspicions arose online that the design of the 1€ coin used an unlicensed image of a marten on a branch by the Scottish photographer Iain Leach, the designer of the 1€ coin, Stjepan Pranjković, withdrew his design on 7 February. On 8 February, the Croatian National Bank announced they will hold a new competition for the design of the Croatian 1€ coin with a marten motif.

On 4 May 2022, at the 15th session of the National Council for the Introduction of the Euro, the new 1€ coin design was presented to the public. The chosen design depicts a stylised marten on a checkerboard background by artists Jagor Šunde, David Čemeljić and Fran Zekan. This new design was approved by the Council of the European Union on 20 April.

On 18 July 2022, the Croatian Mint officially began the production of the euro coins with the Croatian national motif. Workers were set to have three shifts until the end of 2022.

On 1 September 2022, euro banknotes began being distributed to all banks in Croatia.

On 1 October 2022, the newly minted euro coins had begun distribution to all banks in Croatia.

On 20 October 2022, the Executive Board of the European Central Bank (ECB) adopted a Decision on the application of minimum reserves by the ECB following the introduction of the euro in Croatia on 1 January 2023.

Currently, as of October 2022, there are approximately 420 million euro coins minted with the Croatian national motif.

Design

Impact 
The Croatian Ministry of Finance estimated the cost of the changeover from the kuna to the euro to be around 2 billion kuna. Government analysis indicates that most of the cost would be on the loss of the conversion business by the banking system, which is expected to lead to a rise in other banking fees. There is a possibility of a general price increase for consumers, with a simultaneous general currency conversion risk for most debtors.

Future 
Starting in January 2023, the Croatian National Bank will publish quarterly national reference rate for the euro, on the basis of which variable interest rates are calculated. 

From 15 December 2022 to 15 January 2023, there will not be charging fees for cash withdrawals from ATMs to clients of other banks.

A transitional period for the imposing of minimum requirements on institutions located in Croatia will take place from 1 January to 7 February 2023. Institutions located in other eurozone countries may decide to deduct any liabilities owed to institutions located in Croatia from their reserve base for the maintenance periods from 21 December 2022 to 7 February 2023 and from 8 February to 21 March 2023.

Those who have both kunas and euros in credit institutions, unions, payment institutions, and electronic money institutions before the day of the introduction of euro have the right, until the end of February 2023, to close one or more of their accounts and transfer the funds recorded in those accounts to their accounts to accounts of their choice in the same institution, free of charge.

By 1 April 2023, the Croatian National Bank will stop determining denomination structure for paying out euro banknotes at ATMs. Furthermore, until the end of June 2023, all banks must return their amount in euros to those who have payment slips stated in kunas.

Promotion of the euro in Croatia 
Throughout the month of October, four Euro Days were held with the first one being in Osijek on 8 October 2022. The other three Euro Days were held in Rijeka, Split, and Zagreb, all with the aim to promote the upcoming entry of Croatia into the eurozone and educate the local populations about the Euro. 

The Croatian Chamber of Economy (HGK) and the Croatian National Bank have scheduled an online hybrid education on 12 October 2022 with the intention of providing basic information about the Euro and the new coin designs.

Another promotion campaign of the euro in Croatia called "Euro on Wheels" is to take place in 27 cities in Croatia from 19 October until 17 December 2022, with the first one being in Vukovar. The cost of the campaign is estimated at 24 million kn (€3.2 million).

Controversy 
On 21 July 2021, Nikola Tesla was selected to be featured in the euro with nearly 2,600 votes. This resulted in opposition from the National Bank of Serbia due to his Serb ethnicity, although he was born in present-day Croatia. Prime Minister Plenković commented: "If I were the head of the National Bank of Serbia, I would say well done." President of Croatia Zoran Milanović suggested a solution: "When Serbia joins the eurozone, let them recommend Tesla [as a national euro coin motif] as well. Everybody's happy."

Boris Milošević, one of deputy prime ministers of Croatia at the time and a member of the country's Serb minority, praised the move, dubbing Tesla the "symbol that binds us (Serbs and Croats) to the whole world. The citizens of Croatia voted for a Serb from Croatia, who was proud of his people and his homeland, who always remained faithful to his culture—a typical Krajina, Prečani one—and now he is going to be on a Croatian euro coin as one of the recognizable symbols of the Republic of Croatia."

On 4 February 2022, the Croatian government presented the new designs for the euro with national motifs of Croatia, including Nikola Tesla on the 10, 20, and 50 cent coins. This led to another wave of opposition from the Serbian media.

See also 
 Croatia and the euro

References

External links 

 Euro HR

2022 establishments in Croatia
Currencies introduced in 2022
Euro coins by issuing country
Coins of Croatia
Croatia and the European Union